The Knoxville and Holston River Railroad  operates over  within Knoxville and Marbledale, Tennessee. This short line railroad was created in 1998 and is currently owned by Gulf and Ohio Railways. The railroad also hosts a tourist train run by Gulf & Ohio Railways, the Three Rivers Rambler.

References

Gulf and Ohio Railways
Spin-offs of the Norfolk Southern Railway